Hugh McFarlane (June 23, 1815August 16, 1882) was an Irish American immigrant, businessman, and Democratic politician.  He represented Columbia County in the Wisconsin State Assembly during the 1850 session.  Before Wisconsin achieved statehood, he served in the House of Representatives in the 5th Wisconsin Territorial Assembly.

Biography
Born in County Tyrone, Ireland, McFarlane emigrated to the United States and moved to Mineral Point, Michigan Territory, in 1835. In 1843, he settled permanently in the area that would become Portage, Wisconsin, and was in the lumber and merchandise business. McFarlane served in the Wisconsin Territorial House of Representatives in 1847. and the Wisconsin State Assembly in 1850. He was a Democrat. In 1859, he moved  to a farm in Arlington, Wisconsin and was chairman of the Arlington Town Board. He also served as a commissioner of the Wisconsin Farm Mortgage Company. McFarlane died in Arlington, Wisconsin.

Personal life and family
Hugh McFarlane and his wife Sarah ( Dunn) had at least six children, though three died in childhood.  Their only son, Andrew J. McFarlane, served as a first lieutenant in the 23rd Wisconsin Infantry Regiment during the American Civil War.  He died from wounds received at the Siege of Vicksburg.

References

External links
 

1815 births
1882 deaths
Irish emigrants to the United States (before 1923)
People from County Tyrone
People from Portage, Wisconsin
Businesspeople from Wisconsin
Members of the Wisconsin Territorial Legislature
19th-century American politicians
People from Arlington, Wisconsin
People from Mineral Point, Wisconsin
19th-century American businesspeople
Democratic Party members of the Wisconsin State Assembly